Jamaica is an island country situated in the Caribbean Sea, consisting of the third-largest island of the Greater Antilles. Jamaica is a mixed economy with both state enterprises and private sector businesses. Major sectors of the Jamaican economy include agriculture, mining, manufacturing, tourism, and financial and insurance services. Tourism and mining are the leading earners of foreign exchange. Half the Jamaican economy relies on services, with half of its income coming from services such as tourism. An estimated 1.3 million foreign tourists visit Jamaica every year.

Notable firms 
This list includes notable companies with primary headquarters located in the country. The industry and sector follow the Industry Classification Benchmark taxonomy. Organizations which have ceased operations are included and noted as defunct.

See also 
 Economy of Jamaica
 List of airlines of Jamaica
 List of hotels in Jamaica

References 

Jamaica